A monofilament may refer to:

 Monofilament fishing line, a type of thread
 A monofilament as used in a monofilament test in a neurological examination
 Monomolecular wire, a theoretical type of wire consisting of a single strand of molecules

See also 
 filament (disambiguation)

nl:Monofilament